The 2010–11 National League A season was the fourth ice hockey season of the National League A since the reorganization of the Swiss league. 12 teams participated in the league, which was won by HC Davos.

Regular season

Playoffs

Relegation

HC Ambrì-Piotta would later defeat EHC Visp of the National League B 4-1 to remain in the National League A.

External links
  

1
Swiss
National League (ice hockey) seasons